The 1936 Indiana gubernatorial election was held on November 3, 1936. Democratic nominee M. Clifford Townsend defeated Republican nominee Raymond S. Springer with 55.36% of the vote.

General election

Candidates
Major party candidates
M. Clifford Townsend, Democratic, Lieutenant Governor under Paul V. McNutt
Raymond S. Springer, Republican, former judge of the 37th Judicial Circuit Court

Other candidates
Marie B. Tomsich, Socialist
Wenzel Stocker, Communist

Results

References

1936
Indiana
Gubernatorial